Gérard Isbecque (15 March 1897 – 3 August 1970) was a French footballer. He played in four matches for the France national football team in 1923 and 1924.

References

External links
 
 
 

1897 births
1970 deaths
French footballers
France international footballers
Sportspeople from Roubaix
Association football forwards
RC Roubaix players
Footballers at the 1924 Summer Olympics
Olympic footballers of France
Footballers from Hauts-de-France